SFC Capital (formerly known as Startup Funding Club) is an investment fund manager and network of business angels founded in 2012 by Stephen Page, the CEO of the company. It manages the SFC Angel Fund which invests in small companies qualifying for the SEIS and EIS investment schemes in the UK.

Since its inception in 2012, there have been 4 main SEIS/EIS funds. The company has also managed other funds including the Fintech Fund, the Odyssey Fund, and the Epicure SEIS Fund. To date, SFC Capital has invested over £30 million in over 225 companies by combining its funds and its angel network.

Investments

SFC Capital, through its funds or its angel network, has provided seed funding and early-stage growth capital to:

 Onfido, provider of an AI-driven background and identity checking service, founded in Oxford in 2012
 Cognism, a business-to-business sales software provider
 Transcend Packaging, a South Wales-based manufacturer of paper-based drinking straws to the food & drink and restaurant business, which in 2020 pivoted to manufacturing biodegradable face shields to protect food and restaurant industry staff during the COVID-19 pandemic

Awards

SFC Capital has been recognised for its work in the early-stage investment world on several occasions. In July 2016, SFC Capital was named 'Lead Syndicate of the Year 2016' at the UKBAA Angel Investment Awards Gala, an award sponsored by the Angel CoFund. The firm was nominated for the same title in 2017.

In 2017, the organisation was shortlisted in two categories at the Growth Investor Awards – Best Angel Syndicate and Best SEIS Investment Manager. SFC Capital was ultimately presented with the Best Angel Syndicate accolade by UKBAA's CEO Jenny Tooth at the Growth Investor Awards ceremony in November 2017. In February 2018, SFC Capital received the Best Innovation and Rising Star awards from the EIS Association (EISA), the official trade body for the Enterprise Investment Scheme.

References

External links
 https://innovateuk.blog.gov.uk/2016/03/15/innovate-uks-essential-tips-for-start-ups/

Venture capital